The 2022–23 1. FC Saarbrücken season will be the 116th season in the club's football history. They will play in the 3. Liga, their third consecutive season in the third tier since being promoted from the Regionalliga. They also will participate in the Saarland Cup.

Transfers

In

Out

Competitions

Friendlies

3. Liga

Table

Matches

Saarland Cup

References 

1. FC Saarbrücken seasons
German football clubs 2022–23 season